Cardinal Newman High School is an American Catholic high school located in Santa Rosa, California. The school was originally for boys, but shared some facilities with Ursuline High School for girls; it has been coeducational since Ursuline's closure in 2011. Its colors are Cardinal Red and Gold; its mascot is the cardinal. It is located in the Roman Catholic Diocese of Santa Rosa in California.

In October 2017, the school was significantly damaged by the Tubbs Fire.

History 

Cardinal Newman High School was founded on April 24, 1964, and named for Cardinal John Henry Newman. It was the brother school of a girls' secondary school located on the same road named Ursuline High School. The campuses shared a common eating area. The schools' academic programs were also intertwined, with most classes for juniors and seniors and some freshman and sophomore language classes taught co-educationally. The two schools also collaborated on school-sponsored social events such as the drama program. The schools had separate associated student bodies that collaborated in the discharge of their duties. Athletics, with the exceptions of cross country, track & field, swimming, and water polo, were not collaborations. The schools had separate offices, libraries, computer labs, classrooms, and gymnasiums, but in addition to the cafeteria they shared a multipurpose facility and some athletics facilities. Class rankings for Newman and Ursuline were separate, but the students graduated together, with at least one valedictorian and salutatorian from each school addressing their graduation class.

Ursuline announced on November 9, 2010, that it would close at the end of the academic year. Cardinal Newman became coeducational at the start of the 2011–2012 academic year.

In October 2017, much of the campus was destroyed in the Tubbs Fire. Classes resumed in church buildings in four separate parishes; donations to the school included videoconferencing equipment from Cisco Systems, but poor wireless internet prevented their use. Classes are scheduled to resume on campus in January 2018, housed in portable buildings.

Academics 
Cardinal Newman's curriculum includes mathematics, starting at pre-algebra to Advanced Placement calculus; sciences, consisting of biology, chemistry and physics; English; social studies, including government, economics, and history; Spanish language; and theology. Freshmen are required to complete physical education, basic computer literacy, health, public speaking and drawing. Advanced placement classes are offered in most subject areas. Electives include psychology, the school newspaper, weight training, music classes, and advanced art classes. Students take seven courses each school year.

According to the Acton Institute's Catholic High School Honor Roll, Cardinal Newman was one of the top 50 Catholic high schools in the nation for 2005.

View the School Profile here. https://www.cardinalnewman.org/about/school-profile

Sports 

In 2005, San Francisco 49ers Hall of Famer Joe Montana became a part-time quarterback coach for the team. Former NFL player and author Keith Dorney also assisted with the team from 2003 to 2006. In the 2005-2006 season, CN football won both NBL and Section 3A Champs. In 2019, the team was led by Defensive Linemen Bailey Ayre and Quarterback Jackson Pavitt, to a near perfect 14-1 record including a Division 3AA State Championship.

The school also has baseball and basketball teams.

Notable alumni
 Jason Alexander – MLB pitcher for the Milwaukee Brewers
 Scott Alexander (2007) – MLB pitcher for the San Francisco Giants
 Robert C. O'Brien – 28th National Security Advisor
 Jerry Robinson (1976) – UCLA linebacker, 3-time All-American, played for Philadelphia Eagles, member of College Football Hall of Fame
 Stephen Tomasin (2012) – professional rugby player; the United States national rugby sevens team
 John Wetteland (1984) – former professional MLB baseball player, World Series MVP Award for 1996
 Scooby Wright – University of Arizona All-American linebacker, plays for the Birmingham Stallions of the United States Football League (USFL)

References

External links 

Educational institutions established in 1964
Catholic secondary schools in California
High schools in Santa Rosa, California
Boys' schools in California
Roman Catholic Diocese of Santa Rosa
1964 establishments in California